The following is a list of ninja television series and television episodes.

Japanese television

Jidai-geki

Gendai-geki

Tokusatsu

Anime

Ningyō-geki

Kōdan

American television

Action

Speculative fiction

Parody

Animation

International television

Action

Animation

Chinese television

Wuxia

Wushu

South Korean television

Sageuk

See also
List of ninja films
List of ninja video games
Ninja in popular culture

References

Ninja
Television series